Yelagin or Elagin may refer to:

Yelagin (surname)
Yelagin Island
Yelagin Palace